Die Philosophie Herakleitos des Dunklen von Ephesos is an 1857–1858 book by Ferdinand Lassalle, which presents a Hegelian analysis of the pre-Socratic philosopher Heraclitus.

Background

Ferdinand Lassalle was born to a German-Jewish bourgeois family, studied philosophy and philology from 1843 to 1846 and decided from an early age to become a philosopher and social reformer. Heavily influenced by the German idealism of Georg Wilhelm Friedrich Hegel, Lassalle wrote Die Philosophie Herakleitos des Dunklen von Ephesos from 1844 to 1858. He finished it while he lived in Düsseldorf.

Summary
Lassalle analyzes the pre-Socratic Greek philosopher Heraclitus from Ephesus. He attempts to reconstruct Heraclitus' philosophical views from the surviving writings, which consist of fragments quoted in other works. Lassalle extrapolates the surviving material and turns it into a philosophical system, strongly influenced by his own readings of Hegel.

Publication history
Franz Duncker in Berlin published Herakleitos in two volumes. The first volume appeared in the autumn of 1847 and the second in 1858.

Reception
Herakleitos was very well received among Young Hegelians and by scholars influenced by German idealism. Those who personally congratulated and praised Lassalle in letters included Alexander von Humboldt, Karl August Varnhagen von Ense, Karl Richard Lepsius, Heinrich Karl Brugsch and August Böckh, and Lassalle was made a member of the Berlin Philosophical Society by Karl Ludwig Michelet. Outside the Hegelian school, the Schopenhauerian philosopher Philipp Mainländer praised the work for its "brilliant astuteness" and maintained that Lassalle had found "the essence [of the philosophy of Heraclitus] behind a million cloaks". After multiple inquiries from Lassalle to Karl Marx, Marx wrote a polite letter where he complimented the book but recommended Lassalle to rely less on Hegel. In a subsequent letter to Friedrich Engels, Marx dismissed Lassalle's book as a lesser repetition of points from Hegel's Lectures on the History of Philosophy. He characterised Lassalle as self-important, "like a young man with his first smart suit", and wrote about the positive response Herakleitos received from academic circles: "It seems a fact that the elderly professors were astonished to experience this posthumous flowering of a past age." Lassalle became one of Marx' main intellectual competitors within the socialist movement in the 1860s. In the early 20th century, Herakleitos was an important influence for the Swedish writer Vilhelm Ekelund.

See also
 On Nature (Heraclitus)

References

External links
 Volume one and volume two at the Internet Archive 

1857 non-fiction books
German non-fiction books
Heraclitus
Books about philosophers
Ferdinand Lassalle